For the Emperor is a 2014 South Korean neo-noir erotic action film directed by Park Sang-jun, starring Lee Min-ki and Park Sung-woong.

Plot
Promising baseball player Lee Hwan was kicked out of his league and lost everything after being implicated in a match fixing scandal. While waiting for an opportunity to make a comeback, the disgraced pro gets recruited into working for Emperor Capital, the biggest private loan company in Busan. Its loan shark boss, Jeong Sang-ha leads his organized crime mob with a combination of authority, loyalty and cold-bloodedness. Sang-ha takes the naïve young man under his wing, and fascinated by money and power, Hwan soon finds himself climbing the ranks at Emperor Capital. Hwan and Sang-ha successfully take control of all Busan gangs, collecting money through gambling and lending, and killing hundreds of people in the process. Hwan also falls under the charms of a bar owner, Cha Yeon-soo. But when Yeon-soo suddenly vanishes, Hwan suspects that Sang-ha had something to do with her disappearance, and begins to face off against his mentor in a cutthroat, winner-takes-all rivalry.

Cast
 Lee Min-ki as Lee Hwan
 Park Sung-woong as Jeong Sang-ha
 Lee Tae-im as Cha Yeon-soo
 Kim Jong-gu as Han-deuk
 Jeong Heung-chae as Straw cutter
 Lee Jae-won as Kyeong-soo
 Lee Yoo-joon
 Han Jae-young

References

External links 
  
  
  
 
 
 

2014 films
2010s Korean-language films
South Korean action films
Film noir
South Korean neo-noir films
Films based on manhwa
Next Entertainment World films
South Korean crime action films
South Korean erotic thriller films
South Korean erotic films
2010s South Korean films